Hoseynabad-e Khayyat (also Romanized as Ḩoseynābād-e Khayyāṭ; also known as Ḩoseynābād, Ḩoseyn Begī, and Ḩoseyn Beygī) is a village in Firuzabad Rural District, Firuzabad District, Selseleh County, Lorestan Province, Iran. At the 2006 census, its population was 42, in 12 families.

References 

Towns and villages in Selseleh County